The Symphony No. 4 is an orchestral symphony by the American composer William Schuman.  The work was composed on a Guggenheim Fellowship grant awarded to Schuman in 1939.  The piece was given its world premiere by the Cleveland Orchestra under the direction of Artur Rodziński on January 22, 1942.

Composition
The symphony has a duration of roughly 25 minutes and is composed in three numbered movements.

Instrumentation
The work is scored for a large orchestra comprising three flutes (3rd doubling piccolo), three oboes, English horn, three clarinets, E-flat clarinet, bass clarinet, three bassoons, contrabassoon, four horns, three trumpets, three trombones, tuba, timpani, three percussionists, and strings.

Reception
In a contemporary review of the symphony, the composer and music critic Virgil Thomson called it "vague and more than a little diffuse."  In 2005, however, Lawrence A. Johnson of the Sun-Sentinel viewed the work more favorably, writing:

References

Symphonies by William Schuman
1941 compositions